Gothard Kokott (6 October 1943 – 11 January 2021) was a Polish professional football player and later manager.

Career
He was born in Pyskowice. As a manager his historic successes in the top flight with both Raków Częstochowa and Ruch Radzionków made him a club legend at both clubs.

Overall he coached Raków in 94 top division appearances and Ruch in 15. Later, he coached professional futsal club Clearex Chorzów and became a sporting director at Raków.

He received numerous honours and awards for his feats, most notably the Brązowy Krzyż Zasługi, Złota Odznaka PZPN and Srebrna Odznaka PZPN.

He died aged 77 in January 2021, and his funeral was held in Częstochowa where his final resting place is.

References

1943 births
2021 deaths
Polish footballers
Piast Gliwice players
Raków Częstochowa players
Raków Częstochowa managers
Polish football managers
People from Pyskowice
Futsal coaches
Association footballers not categorized by position